Annil Vigneswaran (born 25 August 2003) is a Malaysian footballer currently playing as a defender for German side Freiburger.

Club career

Early life
Born in Kajang, Selangor, Vigneswaran first took an interest in football at the age of seven, with his father enrolling him in a Little League side, for players aged 5–16 across the Klang Valley. At the age of ten, he spent three months with Dutch side Ajax, before returning to Malaysia to join the Kuala Lumpur Youth Soccer (KLYS) team.

Move to Germany
At the age of fourteen, he was scouted by German side SGV Freiberg, and eventually moved to Germany to join the club. In February 2022, he joined 2. Bundesliga side Sandhausen.

For the 2022–23 season, he joined Oberliga Baden-Württemberg side Freiburger, but was assigned to the club's second team in the Landesliga Südbaden 2.

International career
In October 2021, he received a surprise call up to the Malaysia national under-23 football team, having not attended any of the training camps in Malaysia. This call up was criticised by fans, with then-coach Brad Maloney coming to Vigneswaran's defence, saying "assistant coach, Khan Hung Meng used to train this player before he went to Germany a few years ago and he was seen as a very talented player and since then, his performance has started to be monitored."

References

2003 births
People from Selangor
Malaysian footballers
Association football defenders
Association football midfielders
SGV Freiberg players
SV Sandhausen players
Freiburger FC players
Malaysian expatriate footballers
Malaysian expatriate sportspeople in Germany
Expatriate footballers in Germany
Living people